, nicknamed Niku, is a trans-Neptunian object that has an unusual 110° tilted solar orbital plane and retrograde orbit around the Sun.

While the object has not received a formal name, it received the moniker "Niku" (逆骨), meaning "rebellious" in the Chinese language, by its discoverers.

Details
 was discovered by the Mount Lemmon Survey on 31 May 2011. Its rediscovery was announced in August 2016 by a team of astronomers using the Pan-STARRS telescope. It was soon linked with a supposed prograde centaur (inclination = 38° and semi-major axis = 28 AU) that had been lost due to a short observation arc.  is in a 7:9 resonance with Neptune. Currently it is the only object with a nearly polar orbit that is in resonance with a planet. Notably, it is part of a group of objects that orbit the Sun in a highly inclined orbit; the reasons for this unusual orbit are unknown as of August 2016.

The probability of this alignment occurring by chance is 0.016%. These orbits should leave a common plane in a few million years because the precession of prograde and retrograde orbits are in opposite directions. Simulations including the hypothetical Planet Nine did not maintain a common orbital plane and the plane does not coincide with  the plane of the predicted high-inclination large semi-major axis objects of that model. Other simulations with a few Earth-mass dwarf planet on a high-inclination orbit also failed to reproduce the alignment.

References

External links 
 

Trans-Neptunian objects
Centaurs (small Solar System bodies)
Damocloids
Discoveries by MLS
20110531
Minor planets with a retrograde orbit